Lar O'Byrne (10 August 1924 – 5 November 2015) was an Irish footballer.
 
After playing for junior side CY Ringsend, he joined Shamrock Rovers in 1946 under Bob Fullam and was later managed by Jimmy Dunne. In 1951 he fell out with the then owners the Cunninghams over wages and left for Drumcondra F.C. He retired from the game in 1960.

He won one senior cap for the Republic of Ireland on 24 April 1949 in a 2–0 friendly loss against Belgium at Dalymount Park. He represented the League of Ireland XI 4 times while at Glenmalure Park in 1949. The mother of former Hoop Johnny Fullam was Lar's half sister. His cousin Kevin Martin boxed for Ireland at the 1948 Summer Olympics and 1952 Summer Olympics.

On Friday, 10 April 2009, Lar was honoured at Tallaght Stadium with a reception and he was presented with a Dublin Crystal memento of his time with the Club.

As of September 2012 O'Byrne was Rovers' oldest surviving player. He died on 5 November 2015, aged 91.

Honours
Inter-City Cup
  Shamrock Rovers – 1949

References

Sources
 Paul Doolan and Robert Goggins, The Hoops

1924 births
2015 deaths
Association footballers from County Dublin
Republic of Ireland association footballers
Ireland (FAI) international footballers
Shamrock Rovers F.C. players
Drumcondra F.C. players
League of Ireland XI players
Disease-related deaths in the Republic of Ireland
Place of birth missing
Place of death missing
Association footballers not categorized by position